USS Dewey (YFD-1) was a floating dry dock built for the United States Navy in 1905, and named for American Admiral George Dewey. The auxiliary floating drydock was towed to her station in the Philippines in 1906 and remained there until scuttled by American forces in 1942, to prevent her falling into the hands of the invading Japanese.

History 
Laid down in early 1905 at Maryland Steel Co. of Sparrows Point, Maryland, Dewey was floated for the first time on 10 June 1905. She was christened on that date with the traditional bottle of wine by Miss Endicott, the daughter of U.S. Navy Chief of Yards Mordecai T. Endicott. Dewey was very large and state of the art at her time. She displaced 18,500 tons empty. Ballast pontoons tanks were flooded with water to submerge or pumped dry to raise the ship.

The cruiser  helped in towing for part of the convoy. Leaving Solomons, Maryland on the Patuxent River, the convoy sailed to Olongapo, Philippines, via Las Palmas in the Canary Islands; Port Said, Egypt; the Suez Canal; and Singapore. They arrived at their destination U.S. Naval Base Subic Bay on 10 July 1906. This constituted the world's longest tow job at the time.

Dewey was put into service in the U.S. Naval Base Subic Bay at Olongapo and remained active through World War I and the interwar years. Sank 24 May 1910 while receiving a torpedo boat. Raised undamaged on 29 June and put back in service. After the outbreak of World War II, Dewey was moved to Mariveles, Bataan, when the U.S. forces retreated to that peninsula. As the reality of the situation of the U.S. forces became apparent, several undamaged ships, including Dewey, were ordered scuttled to prevent them from falling into the hands of the Japanese. On 8 April 1942,  docking officer, Lt. C. J. Weschler, scuttled the drydock.
Three damaged ships were also scuttled with Dewey; the submarine tender  and the minesweeper  and the tugboat .

She was later raised by the Japanese and towed to Manila Bay, but was sunk again by Allied forces. American Grumman TBF Avenger torpedo bombers attacked her on 12 and 13 November 1944, ending her 35 years of service.

Dewey earned one battle star for her World War II service.

References 

 
 

The voyage of the Dewey by Frank M Bennett, 1906, Hardcover book
 "Across the Atlantic in a Drydock" written by crewmember of the Dewey, 30 June 1906.
"Towing the Drydock Dewey", in American Machinist , 1 March 1906
"The Memorable Voyage of the Drydock Dewey" in the Baltimore Sun Almanac, 1907.
"Towing the Drydock Dewey" – by the Chief Officer, in the Marine Review 4 January 1906.
"Another Glimpse of the Towing of the Dry Dock Dewey" by F. M. Treder in the American Marine Engineer March, 1907
"Dry-Dock Dewey at Journey's End" US Navy, to Commander Hosley, 10 July 1907

External links 

 

Ships built in Sparrows Point, Maryland
World War I auxiliary ships of the United States
World War II auxiliary ships of the United States
1905 ships
Floating drydocks of the United States Navy
World War II shipwrecks in the Pacific Ocean
Maritime incidents in April 1942